"Live Forever" is a song by English singer Liam Payne featuring American DJ trio Cheat Codes for Payne's debut studio album. It is the seventh single from his debut studio album LP1 (2019). The song accompanied the album's release on 6 December 2019.

Composition 
Musically, "Live Forever" is an EDM-pop and dance song. It was written in the key of E minor and has a tempo of 85 BPM.

Live performances 
Payne performed the song on The Tonight Show Starring Jimmy Fallon.

Music video 
The Similar But Different-directed music video accompanied the song's release. It was filmed on the Isle of Wight.

Track listing

Credits and personnel 
Credits adapted from Tidal.

 Liam Payne – vocals
 Trevor Dahl – production 
 Sly – songwriting, production, keyboards
 Sam Preston – songwriting, backing vocals
 E. Kidd Bogart – songwriting
 Oscar Sebastian Enroth – guitar
 Tobias Ring – guitar
 John Hanes – engineering, studio personnel
 Serban Ghenea – mixing, studio personnel
 Randy Merrill – mastering, studio personnel

Charts

Release history

References 

2019 singles
2019 songs
Cheat Codes (DJs) songs
Liam Payne songs
Songs written by Preston (singer)
Songs written by E. Kidd Bogart